Mapleville is a village in Burrillville, Providence County, Rhode Island, United States formerly home to various manufacturers in the 19th century. The village is home to a post office, fire station, churches, library, and various businesses.

External links and references 
 Mapleville Fire Department

Villages in Providence County, Rhode Island
Burrillville, Rhode Island
Villages in Rhode Island